Amedeo Varese (2 July 1890 – 4 January 1969) was an Italian footballer who played as a midfielder. He represented the Italy national football team five times, the first being on 12 January 1913, the occasion of a friendly match against France in a 1–0 away loss.

Honours

Player
Casale
Italian Football Championship: 1913–14

References

1890 births
1969 deaths
Italian footballers
Italy international footballers
Association football midfielders
Casale F.B.C. players
Modena F.C. players
A.C. Milan players